C. inornatum may refer to:
 Chlorophytum inornatum, a flowering plant species
 Compsibidion inornatum, a beetle species